The Clarence D. Chamberlin House is a historic house located at 1434 Second Avenue South in Denison, Iowa.

Description and history 
It is most significant as the boyhood home of Clarence D. Chamberlin, the pilot of the first trans-Atlantic passenger flight, June 4, 1927. The two-story frame house was built in the late 1890s. Chamberlin lived here until 1914, when he left Denison to attend Iowa State College.

The house was listed on the National Register of Historic Places on April 28, 1977.

References

Denison, Iowa
Houses in Crawford County, Iowa
Houses on the National Register of Historic Places in Iowa
National Register of Historic Places in Crawford County, Iowa